The Lambda Literary Foundation (also known as Lambda Literary) is an American LGBTQ literary organization whose mission is to nurture and advocate for LGBTQ writers, elevating the impact of their words to create community, preserve their legacies, and affirm the value of LGBTQ stories and lives.

Function
Lambda Literary traces its beginnings back to 1987 when L. Page (Deacon) Maccubbin, owner of Lambda Rising Bookstore in Washington, DC, published the first Lambda Book Report, which brought critical attention to LGBTQ books. 

The Lambda Literary Awards were born in 1989. At that first gala event, honors went to such distinguished writers as National Book Award finalist Paul Monette (author of Borrowed Time: An AIDS Memoir), Dorothy Allison (Trash), Alan Hollinghurst (The Swimming-Pool Library), and Edmund White (The Beautiful Room is Empty).  The purpose of the awards in the early years was to identify and celebrate the best lesbian and gay books in the year of their publication. The awards gave national visibility  to a literature that had established a firm if nascent beachhead through a network of dynamic lesbian and gay publishers and bookstores springing up across America. Since their inception, the Lambda Literary Awards ceremony has consistently drawn an audience representing every facet of publishing. The awards have ranged over many categories, reflecting the wide spectrum of LGBTQ books, and from the very first year they have made the statement that lesbian, gay, bisexual and trans stories are part of the literature of the nation. The Lammys' first virtual ceremony, in response to COVID-19, was held in 2021. 

Lambda Book Report, meanwhile, grew into a comprehensive review periodical, and together with the Lambda Literary Awards, these programs cemented the reality that a distinct, definable LGBT literature existed. Lambda Literary was created in 1997 as a 501(3)(c) corporation; its first Executive Director was Jim Marks.

In 2007, led by board president Katherine V. Forrest and executive director Charles Flowers, Lambda Literary founded its Writers Retreat for Emerging LGBTQ Voices, a residency designed to offer intensive and sophisticated instruction to selected writers over a carefully designed one week period. Faculty have included well-known and highly regarded writer-teachers such as Dorothy Allison, John Rechy, Fenton Johnson, Katherine V. Forrest, Claire McNab, Bernard Cooper, Nicola Griffith, Ellen Bass, Rigoberto Gonzalez, D. A. Powell, Ellery Washington and Eloise Klein Healy. The retreat provides open access to industry professionals and the opportunity for fellows to create for themselves an ongoing community of practice as they advance in their craft and careers. It is one of Lambda’s most important initiatives: it represents the future of LGBTQ literature.

In early 2010, in an effort led by board member Nicola Griffith, Lambda Literary funded, staffed, and launched an online presence at LambdaLiterary.org which celebrates, supports, serves, informs, entertains, and connects the whole of the diverse community that creates and supports lesbian, gay, bisexual and trans literature. The website replaced the Lambda Book Report. 

In 2012 Lambda Literary launched the LGBTQ Writers in School program, where LGBTQ writers visit K-12 classrooms to discuss LGBTQ literature with young people.

References

External links

LGBT organizations in the United States
LGBT literature in the United States
American literary awards
Arts foundations based in the United States
American writers' organizations
1987 establishments in the United States
501(c)(3) organizations